Paolo Morassutti(27 April 1927 – 9 August 2013) was an Italian entrepreneur best known for having brought the German company Fischerwerke in Padua.

Life and career 
Paolo was named by her mother Gianna Luchetti and his father Federico after his grandfather Paolo Morassutti. After managing several stores in Padua and working for his family business Paolo signed a commercial agreement in 1963 with Artur Fischer, owner of Fischerwerke and founded Fischer Italia to distribute throughout the country of Italy the plastic S-Plug which enables screws to be fastened into masonry substrate. The agreement was maintained until 2000.

He was known also for sponsoring several cultural and sport initiatives.

Paolo Morassutti died in Belluno on August 9, 2013. He was 86 years old.

Bibliography 

 Roverato, Giorgio (1993). Una famiglia e un caso imprenditoriale : I Morassutti (In Italian).4. Neri Pozza.

References 

1927 births
2013 deaths
Italian business executives